Richard Charles Lee Ming-Chak, CBE (7 March 1905 – 6 July 1983) was a Hong Kong businessman and philanthropist.

Early life 
Lee was born on 7 March 1905 in British Hong Kong. Lee's father was Hysan Lee, a prominent local merchant and often nicknamed the "King of Opium". Lee's younger brother was Jung Kong Lee.
Lee's ancestral home was Xinhui, Guangdong, China.

Education 
After Lee studied at the Queen's College, he was sent to study in England and graduated from the Pembroke College, Oxford with the bachelor's and master's degrees in Engineering Science. During his study at Oxford, he was the president of the Central Union of Chinese Students of Great Britain and Ireland.

Career 
Lee worked at the Chinese Red Cross during the Second Sino-Japanese War and returned to Hong Kong in 1945. Besides taking part of the family business, he was also directors of more than 60 companies, including the vice-chairman of the board of directors of the N. M. Rothschild & Sons (Hong Kong) when it opened in Hong Kong in 1973. He was also chairman of the China Light and Power Company. Lee was among the first Hong Kong businessmen to invest in the Mainland China after the Open Door policy in 1979. For instance, he invested in the construction of the Garden Hotel in Guangzhou with director of the PRC Overseas Chinese Affairs Office Liao Chengzhi in 1980. He also invested in the oilfield exploitation in the South China Sea.

Lee was also appointed by the colonial government to many public positions, including the Hong Kong representative of the economic commissions in Australia and Singapore, and the commissions in trade in West Africa and West Germany. Lee was appointed to the Urban Council in 1953 and the Legislative Council briefly in 1955 before he was appointed to the council again from 1959 to 65, succeeding Lo Man-wai. He was also unofficial member of the Executive Council from 1961 to 66. For his public services, he was awarded Officer and Commander of the Order of the British Empire in 1949 and 1963 respectively.

Lee was also member of the Court and Council and the Building and Finance Committees of the University of Hong Kong and the vice-chairman of the Court of the Chinese University of Hong Kong. He received honorary degrees from the two universities in 1964.

Lee was a Freemason and was the Grand Master of Freemasonry for Hong Kong and Far East District from 1961 to 83.

Personal 

On 15 May 1941, Lee's daughter Vivienne Poy was born in British Hong Kong. She is the first Asian Canadian to be appointed to the Senate of Canada. The Richard Charles Lee Canada-Hong Kong Library was founded by Poy in her father's honour.

Lee died of heart attack on 6 July 1983 at his residence in Hong Kong.

References

External links 
The Industrial History of Hong Kong Group - Richard Charles Lee

1905 births
1983 deaths
Hong Kong businesspeople
Hong Kong philanthropists
Alumni of Pembroke College, Oxford
Hong Kong Freemasons
Masonic Grand Masters
Members of the Executive Council of Hong Kong
Members of the Legislative Council of Hong Kong
Members of the Urban Council of Hong Kong
Commanders of the Order of the British Empire
20th-century philanthropists
Alumni of Queen's College, Hong Kong